Sir Godfrey Pattison Collins,  (26 June 1875 – 13 October 1936) was a Scottish Liberal Party (and later National Liberal Party) politician.

He entered the Royal Navy in 1888 and was a midshipman, East Indian Station from 1890 to 1893. He was elected as Liberal Member of Parliament (MP) for Greenock in 1910 and sat for the constituency until his death (from 1931 as a Liberal National).

He was Parliamentary Private Secretary to J. B. Seely, as Secretary of State for War from 1910 to 1914, and to J. W. Gulland, Chief Liberal Whip from 1915. He served in Egypt, Gallipoli, and Mesopotamia from 1915 to 1917, and was appointed a lieutenant-colonel in September 1916. He was a Junior Lord of the Treasury from 1919 to 1920 and Chief Liberal Whip from November 1924 to 1926. From 1932 to 1936 he served as Secretary of State for Scotland.

As Secretary of State for Scotland he was responsible for over thirty Bills affecting Scotland, chiefly: a scheme for the creation of smallholdings, the Herring Industry Act of 1935 (establishing the Herring Industry Board), the Illegal Trawling (Scotland) Act, the Education (Scotland) Bill of 1936, which sought to raise the school leaving age to fifteen from 1939, and the Housing (Scotland) Act of 1935, which laid down a statutory standard of overcrowding and sought to effect widespread slum clearances and the building of low-rent accommodation for low-wage earners.

He was appointed a CMG in 1917, KBE in 1919 and a Privy Counsellor in 1932.

References 
 Torrance, David, The Scottish Secretaries (Birlinn 2006)
Pottinger, George, The Secretaries of State For Scotland, 1926-1976 (Scottish Academic Press, 1979)

External links 
 

1875 births
1936 deaths
Companions of the Order of St Michael and St George
Knights Commander of the Order of the British Empire
Scottish Liberal Party MPs
Members of the Privy Council of the United Kingdom
Members of the Parliament of the United Kingdom for Scottish constituencies
National Liberal Party (UK, 1922) politicians
National Liberal Party (UK, 1931) politicians
Royal Navy officers
Secretaries of State for Scotland
UK MPs 1910
UK MPs 1910–1918
UK MPs 1918–1922
UK MPs 1922–1923
UK MPs 1923–1924
UK MPs 1924–1929
UK MPs 1929–1931
UK MPs 1931–1935
UK MPs 1935–1945